Christ at the Column refers to the flagellation of Christ.

Christ at the Column may also refer to:

Christ at the Column (Bramante), a painting attributed to Donato Bramante
Christ at the Column (Caravaggio), a painting by Caravaggio
Christ at the Column (Antonello da Messina), a 1475 painting by Antonello da Messina
Christ at the Column (Gregorio Fernández), a sculpture by Gregorio Fernández